The 2014 Wartburg Knights football team represented Wartburg College as a member of the Iowa Intercollegiate Athletic Conference (IIAC) during the 2014 NCAA Division III football season. Led by Rick Willis in his 16th season as head coach, the Knights compiled an overall record of 12–1 with a mark of 8–0 in conference play, winning IIAC title for the second year in a row and earning an automatic bid to the NCAA Division III Football Championship playoffs. Wartburg lost in the quarterfinal round of the playoffs to eventual national champion Wisconsin–Whitewater. The Knights held a 17-point lead early in the fourth quarter, but lost 37–33. The team played home games at Walston-Hoover Stadium in Waverly, Iowa.

Schedule
Wartburg's 2014 regular season scheduled consisted of five home and five away games.

References

Wartburg
Wartburg Knights football seasons
Wartburg Knights football